Thyine wood is a 15th-century English name for a wood from the tree known botanically as Tetraclinis articulata (syn. Callitris quadrivalvis, Thuja articulata). The name is derived from the Greek word thuon, "fragrant wood," or possibly thuein, “to sacrifice”, and it was so called because it was burnt in sacrifices, on account of its fragrance.

In Rome, wood from this tree was called citrum, "citrus wood". It was considered very valuable, and was used for making articles of furniture by the Greeks and Romans. Craftsmen who worked in citrus wood and ivory had their own guild (collegium).

Thyine wood is mentioned in the King James Version of the Bible at Revelation 18:12 as being among the articles which would cease to be purchased when Babylon fell. The New International Version translates the passage "citron wood"; the Amplified Bible translates it as "scented wood". This wood is also mentioned in the 1st Book of Kings, chapter 10, in a list of items brought to Solomon by the navy of Hiram.

The resin is used as the basis for euparal, a mounting medium used in microscopy.

Notes

References
Use in microscopy

Wood
History of furniture
Plant common names